Frederick Gideon Eldridge (May 24, 1837 – July 22, 1889) was president of the Knickerbocker Trust Company in 1884.

Biography
He was born on May 24, 1837 in Marblehead, Massachusetts. He married Alice Lee Goodrich in 1859.

He became president of the Knickerbocker Trust Company in 1884. He died at the Hotel Vendome (New York City) on July 21, 1889. He was buried in Green-Wood Cemetery.

External links

References

1837 births
1889 deaths
Knickerbocker Trust Company
Burials at Green-Wood Cemetery
People from Marblehead, Massachusetts
American bank presidents